Dorcaschema nigrum is a species of beetle in the family Cerambycidae. It was described by Say in 1826, originally under the genus Saperda. It is known from Canada and the United States.

References

Dorcaschematini
Beetles described in 1826